Pahost or Pogost is an agrotown in Byerazino District of Minsk Region in Belarus. It is the administrative center of the Pahostskaya Village Council and had a population of 611 according to the 2009 census.

History 
Pahost was first shown on the maps of the Grand Duchy of Lithuania during the 16th century as part of Lubuszany Parish, Minsk Powiat of Minsk Voivodeship. In 1668 it was granted the status of miasteczko by John II Casimir Vasa. Between 16 and 17 June 1708, on his way to Lubuszany during the Great Northern War, Charles XII of Sweden passed through Pahost, devastating the region. In 1721 Pahost had nine dwellings and was in Orsha Powiat, owned by a landowner. Augustus III of Poland affirmed the miasteczko privileges of Pahost in 1746.

After the Second Partition of Poland in 1793, Pahost become part of the Russian Empire. From 12 December 1796 it was a town in the Igumensky Uyezd of Minsk Governorate. It was owned by Ludwik Tyszkiewicz in 1799 and a year later had 132 dwellings and 691 residents, with a Uniate church, parsonage, tavern, and mill. In 1810 or 1816 a new church was built using peasant resources. In 1845 the town was the property of Countess  Wańkowicz and had 403 inhabitants. Its population grew to 444 in 1858, when it was owned by Count Potocki. A primary school was opened in 1863 and by 1892 had 50 students. In 1866 Pahost had 775 inhabitants, a water mill, a church, a synagogue, and a prayer school. Pahost continued to grow and in the Russian Empire Census of 1897 was recorded as having a population of 1,435, church, three prayer schools, a bakery, 14 shops, an inn and a tavern.

Transportation 

References

Citations

Bibliography 

 

Populated places in Minsk Region
Agrotowns in Belarus
Minsk Voivodeship
Igumensky Uyezd
Byerazino District